Bosko's Holiday is a one-reel 1931 short subject animated cartoon, part of the Bosko series. It was directed by Hugh Harman, and first released on July 18, 1931 as part of the Looney Tunes series from the Leon Schlesinger animation studio and distributed by Warner Brothers. The film score was composed by Frank Marsales.

Plot
The cartoon opens with the phone ringing loudly, while Bosko is sleeping. The anthropomorphic telephone can't get its owner to wake up no matter how insistently it rings, since he is a heavy sleeper. It then turns its attention to an anthropomorphic alarm clock sleeping nearby, snoring with a "tick tock" sound. So the phone wakes up the alarm clock, so it can wake Bosko up. The alarm clock also has trouble waking up Bosko. He does not respond to its own ringing with bell-like sounds, nor to it hitting a brush against the bedpan. The alarm clock finally pokes him in the bottom with one of its pointy hands, waking him up. He wakes up screaming.

Bosko goes to the phone, and answers a call from Honey. She invites Bosko to a picnic, and Bosko seems pleased with the idea. She asks him to hurry up, says goodbye and then hangs up the phone. Bosko quickly gets ready for the excursion. The phone says "Scram, Bosko, scram!".

Bosko goes to get his car. The garage looks like a big doghouse, and Bosko summons the resident. Out comes not a dog but a car with a personality of its own. He gets into the car and leaves. Several little cars, presumably children of the big one, follow them. He stops to tell them to go home. He then remarks "Ain't that cute"? 

The car is driving itself, leaving Bosko with nothing to do during the ride. Then, Bosko gets a banjo and sings, until a string breaks. So Bosko takes a mouse's tail to use as a replacement. The mouse seems to serve as an ornament in the car. The mouse is pretty mad at Bosko for taking his tail. As soon as Bosko arrives at Honey's house, the banjo strings come off. He then tries again to pull the mouse's tail off, but the mouse pulls its tail away and sticks his tongue out at Bosko. It then leaves. Bosko again responds "Ain't that cute", and sticks his own tongue out.

Bosko arrives at Honey's house to get her for the picnic, and calls her from the house's front yard. She comes out to her balcony and says "Hello, Bosko". Honey's dog follows the car. The car tries to drive up a very steep hill and path, and consequently goes stuck. Bosko gets out and tries to push the car. The dog pulls Bosko's pants, which makes him let go of the car. The car consequently goes backwards and knocks Bosko out. The dog licks Bosko, he regains consciousness and replies with "Hey!". He is about to kick the dog, when the dog escapes.

Bosko gets the car moving, and the dog comes back and bites a tire. This act causes the air from the tire to be sucked out, into the dog. It inflates like a balloon. Bosko gets mad and sucks the air back to the tire.  The unhappy dog leaves, but soon comes back. When the trio walk to the picnic location, they find a log. They put the picnic basket there and start conversing. Bosko whispers an ungentlemanly suggestion to Honey's ear, which causes her to stand up in a huff.  Bosko resorts to tempting her with food. He eats a sandwich, chewing noisily with his mouth open, and says it tasted sure fine. She seems tempted. The dog licks Honey's bottom, but she thinks Bosko did it. She slaps him and leaves in anger. Bosko says "Aw, nuts" and the film ends.

Notes
Johnny Murray serves as the voice of Bosko. Rochelle Hudson voices Honey. Both are uncredited. The film was directed by Hugh Harman and Rudolf Ising. They were also the producers of the film, with Leon Schlesinger as an associate producer. The film was animated by Friz Freleng and Paul Smith. The musical score was a work of Frank Marsales.

This is the first cartoon where the title card had Bosko's name in it, and almost all subsequent entries in the series followed this practice. The film has a simple plot which serves as an excuse for a series of inventive gags. The action is otherwise unremarkable. The short marks a turning point in the Bosko film series and the Looney Tunes series in general. This is the first short where the plot does not revolve around singing and dancing. Singing-and-dancing plots were subsequently reserved for the Merrie Melodies series.

The voices of both Bosko and Honey while speaking on the phone sound childish. Rochelle Hudson was 15 years old when recording the film, while Johnny Murray's age is unknown.
 
The first meeting of the lovers, with Honey in the balcony and Bosko on the grounds, is reminiscent of the balcony scene from Romeo and Juliet (1597).

References

External links
Bosko's Holiday on YouTube
Bosko's Holiday on the Internet Movie Database

1931 films
1931 animated films
1930s American animated films
1930s animated short films
Films directed by Hugh Harman
Films directed by Rudolf Ising
Looney Tunes shorts
Bosko films
Films scored by Frank Marsales
American black-and-white films